The God Who Riots: Taking Back the Radical Jesus is a book written by Damon Garcia and published by Broadleaf Books.

Background 
The book is 194 pages and 10 chapters long. The book's acquisition editor was Lisa Kloskin. Garcia did a book launch and Q&A on August 23, 2022 in Santa Barbara, CA. The book discusses how Christianity has harmed people through things like colonialism. Karen González wrote in Sojourners that "Garcia makes complex concepts accessible yet still resonant and challenging." Jacqueline Parascandola wrote in Library Journal that "Garcia offers a guide to social change with an accessible and easy-to-understood model." The Publisher Weekly review said that "Garcia thoughtfully examines such topics as wealth inequality, LGBTQ rights, and colonialism through a Christian lens." Jenny Hamilton wrote in Booklist that the book is an "accessible, impassioned debut."

References

External links 
 

Books about Christianity
Books about economic inequality
Works about LGBT and Christianity
2022 non-fiction books
American non-fiction books